A debris disk  (American English), or debris disc (Commonwealth English), is a circumstellar disk of dust and debris in orbit around a star. Sometimes these disks contain prominent rings, as seen in the image of Fomalhaut on the right. Debris disks are found around stars with mature planetary systems, including at least one debris disk in orbit around an evolved neutron star. Debris disks can also be produced and maintained as the remnants of collisions between planetesimals, otherwise known as asteroids and comets.

As of 2001, more than 900 candidate stars had been found to possess a debris disk. They are usually discovered by examining the star system in infrared light and looking for an excess of radiation beyond that emitted by the star. This excess is inferred to be radiation from the star that has been absorbed by the dust in the disk, then re-radiated away as infrared energy.

Debris disks are often described as massive analogs to the debris in the Solar System. Most known debris disks have radii of 10–100 astronomical units (AU); they resemble the Kuiper belt in the Solar System, although the Kuiper belt does not have a high enough dust mass to be detected around even the nearest stars. Some debris disks contain a component of warmer dust located within 10 AU from the central star. This dust is sometimes called exozodiacal dust by analogy to zodiacal dust in the Solar System.

Observation history

In 1984 a debris disk was detected around the star Vega using the IRAS satellite. Initially this was believed to be a protoplanetary disk, but it is now known to be a debris disk due to the lack of gas in the disk and the age of the star. The first four debris disks discovered with IRAS are known as the "fabulous four": Vega, Beta Pictoris, Fomalhaut, and Epsilon Eridani. Subsequently, direct images of the Beta Pictoris disk showed irregularities in the dust, which were attributed to gravitational perturbations by an unseen exoplanet. That explanation was confirmed with the 2008 discovery of the exoplanet Beta Pictoris b. 

Other exoplanet-hosting stars, including the first discovered by direct imaging (HR 8799), are known to also host debris disks. The nearby star 55 Cancri, a system that is also known to contain five planets, also was reported to have a debris disk, but that detection could not be confirmed.
Structures in the debris disk around Epsilon Eridani suggest perturbations by a planetary body in orbit around that star, which may be used to constrain the mass and orbit of the planet.

On 24 April 2014, NASA reported detecting debris disks in archival images of several young stars, HD 141943 and HD 191089, first viewed between 1999 and 2006 with the Hubble Space Telescope, by using newly improved imaging processes.

In 2021, observations of a star, VVV-WIT-08, that became obscured for a period of 200 days may have been the result of a debris disk passing between the star and observers on Earth. Two other stars, Epsilon Aurigae and TYC 2505-672-1, are reported to be eclipsed regularly and it has been determined that the phenomenon is the result of disks orbiting them in varied periods, suggesting that VVV-WIT-08 may be similar and have a much longer orbital period that just has been experienced by observers on Earth. VVV-WIT-08 is ten times the size of the Sun in the constellation of Sagittarius.

Origin

During the formation of a Sun-like star, the object passes through the T-Tauri phase during which it is surrounded by a gas-rich, disk-shaped nebula. Out of this material are formed planetesimals, which can continue accreting other planetesimals and disk material to form planets. The nebula continues to orbit the pre-main-sequence star for a period of  until it is cleared out by radiation pressure and other processes. Second generation dust may then be generated about the star by collisions between the planetesimals, which forms a disk out of the resulting debris. At some point during their lifetime, at least 45% of these stars are surrounded by a debris disk, which then can be detected by the thermal emission of the dust using an infrared telescope. Repeated collisions may cause a disk to persist for much of the lifetime of a star.

Typical debris disks contain small grains 1–100 μm in size. Collisions will grind down these grains to sub-micrometre sizes, which will be removed from the system by radiation pressure from the host star. In very tenuous disks such as the ones in the Solar System, the Poynting–Robertson effect can cause particles to spiral inward instead. Both processes limit the lifetime of the disk to 10 Myr or less. Thus, for a disk to remain intact, a process is needed to continually replenish the disk. This can occur, for example, by means of collisions between larger bodies, followed by a cascade that grinds down the objects to the observed small grains.

For collisions to occur in a debris disk, the bodies must be gravitationally perturbed sufficiently to create relatively large collisional velocities. A planetary system around the star can cause such perturbations, as can a binary star companion or the close approach of another star. The presence of a debris disk may indicate a high likelihood of exoplanets orbiting the star. Furthermore, many debris disks also show structures within the dust (for example, clumps and warps or asymmetries) that point to the presence of one or more exoplanets within the disk. The presence or absence of asymmetries in our own trans-Neptunian belt remains controversial although they might exist.

Known belts
Belts of dust or debris have been detected around many stars, including the Sun, including the following:

The orbital distance of the belt is an estimated mean distance or range, based either on direct measurement from imaging or derived from the temperature of the belt. The Earth has an average distance from the Sun of 1 AU.

See also
 Accretion disk
 Asteroid belt
 
 Protoplanetary disk

References

External links

 

Debris disk